Ivanuku Thannila Gandam ( He Has Bad Luck With Water / He Has Problems With Liquor) is a 2015 Indian Tamil language comedy film written and directed by S. N. Shaktevel in his debut and produced by V. Venkatraj. The film stars Deepak Dinkar and Neha Ratnakaran (making her debut), while Rajendran essays a supporting role. The film released on 13 March 2015.

Plot
Saravana Perumal (Deepak Dinkar) is a television anchor experiencing hard times in both his professional and personal life. He is being bested at his workplace by a colleague, harassed by a loan shark, and fears that his girlfriend Deepika (Neha Ratnakaran) is having an affair. Saravanan goes to a party with his friends, where he becomes intoxicated. While drunk, he unknowingly tells hitman Mark (Rajendran) of his troubles who takes pity on him and offers to kill his competitor at work, the loan shark, and Deepika. When he wakes the following morning, he finds that his colleague and the loan shark are dead, and a call from Mark informing him of their conversation the previous night. Saravanan tries to prevent Mark from killing Deepika. While attempting to murder Deepika, Mark falls from a ledge and dies, without Saravanan knowing his true identity as he was drunk when he met Mark. Towards the end, it is revealed that Mark's targets all died by accident before Mark could kill them. Saravanan is unaware of Mark's death and when he later marries Deepika, he becomes paranoid that every man who meets Deepika is secretly the hitman trying to kill her.

Cast

Deepak Dinkar as Saravana Perumal "Saravanan"
Neha Ratnakaran as Deepika
Rajendran as Mark
Sentrayan as Milk Pandi
Elango Kumaravel as James
Pandiarajan as Thirupathi
Manobala as Dr. Markandeyan
M. S. Bhaskar as Ponvandu
Swaminathan as Kuzhandaivel
T. M. Karthik as Kasinathan
Subbu Panchu Arunachalam
Yogi Babu as Man in hospital
Gana Bala
George Maryan
Sandy  as Maika Mahesh
Boxer Arumugam as Soodu Baskar
Telephone Mani as Mani
V. Venkatraj
Moses
Arunachalam
Easwar

Production
Filming was completed in October 2014.

Music

The soundtrack was composed by A7, and the audio was officially released online on 2 March 2015.

Release
The film released on 13 March 2015. The satellite rights of the film were sold to Polimer.

Reception
Ivanuku Thannila Gandam opened to negative reviews, but they singled out Rajendran as the highlight of the film. Avinash Gopinath of Filmibeat gave the film two out of five stars. Gopinath praised Rajendran's performance in the film who he felt carried the film. He also commented that Dinkar's acting as the lead needed refinement. Gopinath bemoaned the screenplay and felt some "unwanted sub-plots" could have been edited out. Sify rated the film as average. They appreciated Rajendran's comic acting stating "the film belongs to Rajendran". However they felt scenes not involving him showed that the filmmakers "tried too hard to make the film as a laughathon". The soundtrack of the film was described as "passable". Tamilstar reviewer Kumaresun gave the film two out of five stars. He pointed to Rajendran's comic role as "the high point" of the film. However he felt the "movie is amateurish, and ends up nowhere". M. Suganth of The Times of India rated the film two out of five stars and stated "It is a film where amateurishness is passed for attitude, and silliness, and crass dialogues... for comedy".

References

External links 
 

2010s Tamil-language films
2015 films